Myzostoma fuscomaculatum, the crinoid worm, is a  species of marine worm in the family Myzostomida.

Description
Crinoid worms are tiny worms with stubby legs which live on the elegant feather star, Tropiometra carinata. They are usually well camouflaged to match their host. They grow to 2mm in total length.

Distribution
Crinoid worms are found off the South African coast in False Bay in 10m to at least 35m of water. They appear to be endemic.

Ecology
These animals are parasitic on their host crinoid and eat scraps of its food and any waste products.

References 

Polychaetes
Animals described in 2008